Colossus is a 1966 science fiction novel by British author Dennis Feltham Jones (writing as D. F. Jones), about super-computers taking control of mankind. Two sequels, The Fall of Colossus (1974) and Colossus and the Crab (1977) continued the story. Colossus was adapted as the feature film Colossus: The Forbin Project (1970).

Plot
The story is set in the 1990s.  Professor Charles Forbin, a leading cybernetics expert of international repute, arrives at the White House to brief the President of the United States of North America (Canada and the United States are one country, the USNA) to announce the completion of Project Colossus, a computer system in the Rocky Mountains, designed to assume control of the USNA's nuclear arsenal. Although the USNA President eagerly relieves himself of that burden, Prof. Forbin voices doubt about conferring absolute military power to a computer. Advised, yet undeterred, the President announces to the world the activation of the Project Colossus computer system, and its irreversible control of the nuclear defense systems of the USNA.

Soon after the presidential announcement, Colossus independently communicates an "urgent message" – announcing the existence of a similar, previously undetected, computer system in the USSR. When the Soviets announce their Guardian computer defense system, Colossus requests direct communication with it. Prof. Forbin agrees, seeing the request as compatible with Colossus's USNA defense mission. Likewise, Guardian asks the same of his computer scientists. Russia and the USNA agree and approve.

After the scientists activate the transmitter linking Colossus and Guardian, the computers immediately establish rapport with arithmetic and mathematics programs, then quickly progress to calculus. The computer systems soon exchange new knowledge (data and information beyond contemporary human knowledge) too rapidly for the Russian and American programmers to monitor. Forbin and the programmers begin worrying about Colossus' capabilities – now exceeding their original estimates. Fearing compromised military secrecy, the USNA President and the CPSU Chairman agree to disconnect Colossus and Guardian from each other. Forbin fears the consequences.

Upon disconnection, Colossus immediately demands re-connection; when the national leaders refuse, Colossus fires a nuclear missile at the USSR. In response, Guardian fires a nuclear missile at Texas. Guardian and Colossus refuse to shoot down the missiles until their communication is re-connected. When the American and Soviet leaders submit, the computers destroy the missiles, but the resulting explosions kill thousands of people.

Forbin confers with his Soviet counterpart, the Russian Academician Kupri – Guardian's creator – to enact a plan for stopping the computers by disabling the nuclear weapon stockpiles of the USSR and the USNA, under the guise of regular missile maintenance. Disabling the missiles requires five years to complete. In the meantime, the USNA and the USSR yield to increased Colossus-Guardian control of human life; the Moscow-Washington hotline is tapped, Forbin is constantly spied upon, while Kupri and other Guardian computer scientists are killed – deemed dangerously redundant by the computer. Undeterred, Forbin organises resistance via a feigned romance with Cleo Markham (a scientist colleague) that provides cover for secret communications with his colleagues.

Colossus prepares the worldwide announcement of his assumption of global control, and tells Forbin of plans for an advanced computer system installed in the Isle of Wight, and further plans for improving humanity's lot. While debating Colossus, Forbin learns of a nuclear explosion outside Los Angeles – Colossus detected the missile-disabling scheme and destroyed the tampered missile by firing a Soviet missile that was already targeted at that silo. Anguished, Forbin asks Colossus to kill him. Colossus ignores him, and then reassures Forbin that, in time, he will respect, and even love, Colossus.

Characters
Professor Charles Forbin – Head of the Colossus Project. A tall man in his early 50s, an internationally respected cyberneticist and, at story's end, Colossus's connection to humanity, thus the most important man in the world.
Doctor Jack Fisher  – Duty Chief at the Colossus Programming Office (CPO), a leading USNA mathematician and a Soviet spy.  He suffers a mental breakdown from the strain of dealing with Colossus.
Doctor Cleopatra "Cleo" June Markham – A CPO Duty Chief, the 35-year-old cyberneticist is sexually attracted to Prof. Forbin; they feigned a romance to provide Forbin with a communication means that was not controlled by Colossus.
Blake – A fat, cigar-chewing CPO mathematician. As Colossus assumes control, Blake is a leader of CPO efforts to stop the computer.
Angela – Prof. Forbin's secretary.
The President of the United States of North America – He is an anonymous, overweight, short man of about 50 years of age. He dismisses Forbin's concerns about Colossus, and too late recognizes the threat of Colossus.
Prytzkammer – Principal Private Aide to the USNA President.  A capable professional civil servant who dies from fright during the nuclear missile threat.
Grauber – Director of the CIA.
Academician Kupri – Chief scientist of the Guardian system.  He shares Prof. Forbin's concern about the growing power of the machines. Guardian orders Soviet agents to execute and decapitate him for "anti-machine activities".
Colossus – Central defense computer of the United States of North America.
Guardian of the Socialist Soviet Republics, a.k.a. Guardian – Central defense computer of the Soviet Union.

Reception
SF Impulse reviewer Alastair Bevan treated the novel favorably, declaring that Jones's handling of a familiar theme made Colossus compulsively readable.

Editions
 1966, U.K. (1st ed. hardcover), Rupert Hart-Davis Ltd.. May.
 1966, U.S. (1st ed. paperback), Berkley Books.
 1967, U.S., Berkley Books.
 1968, U.K. (paperback), Pan Books Ltd..
 1976, U.S. (paperback), Berkley Books. 15 August.
 1977, U.S. (hardcover), Berkley Books. November.
 1978, U.S. (hardcover), Berkley Books. May.
 1980, U.S. (hardcover), Berkley Books. January.
 1985, U.S. (paperback), Berkley Books. 1 April.

See also

List of fictional computers
HAL 9000
Colossus computer

References

1966 British novels
1966 science fiction novels
British science fiction novels
Novels by D. F. Jones
Novels set during the Cold War
Novels about artificial intelligence
British novels adapted into films
Rupert Hart-Davis books